Beech Fork Bridge, Mackville Road, near Springfield, Kentucky, is a Pratt truss bridge which was built in 1884.  It was built by the King Iron Bridge Co. and crosses the Beech Fork of the Salt River. It was listed on the National Register of Historic Places in 1989.

It was then one of only eight King bridges surviving statewide.

See also 
 Cartwright Creek Bridge nearby bridge also built by King Iron Bridge Co.
 National Register of Historic Places listings in Washington County, Kentucky

References

Road bridges on the National Register of Historic Places in Kentucky
Bridges completed in 1884
National Register of Historic Places in Washington County, Kentucky
Transportation in Washington County, Kentucky
1884 establishments in Kentucky
Pratt truss bridges in the United States
Salt River (Kentucky)